The 1976 All-Ireland Minor Football Championship was the 45th staging of the All-Ireland Minor Football Championship, the Gaelic Athletic Association's premier inter-county Gaelic football tournament for boys under 18.

Kerry entered the championship as defending champions; however, they were defeated by Cork in the Munster final.

On 26 September 1976, Galway won the championship following a 1–10 to 0–6 defeat of Cork in the All-Ireland final. This was their fourth All-Ireland title overall and their first in six championship seasons.

Results

Connacht Minor Football Championship

Quarter-Final

Mayo 1-12 Leitrim 0-9.

Semi-Finals

Galway 0-18 Mayo 2-7. 

Sligo 4-7 Roscommon 3-7 Ballymote.

Final

Galway 6-16 Sligo 0-3 Tuam.

Leinster Minor Football Championship

1976	Dublin	2–08	Offaly	0–13	Croke Park, Dublin

Munster Minor Football Championship

1976	Cork	0–10 (10)	Kerry	1–05 (8)	Páirc Uí Chaoimh

Ulster Minor Football Championship

1976	Tyrone	5–07	Cavan	1–09

All-Ireland Minor Football Championship
Semi-Finals

Final

References

1976
All-Ireland Minor Football Championship